Ermershausen is a municipality in the district of Haßberge in Bavaria in Germany.

Notable people
 Narziß Ach (October 29, 1871 in Ermershausen, Bavaria – 25 July 1946 in Munich) was a German psychologist and university lecturer in Königsberg, Prussia and Göttingen, Germany.
 Louis Kissinger (1887–1982), father of Henry Kissinger

References

Haßberge (district)